Norristown is an unincorporated community in Washington Township, Shelby County, in the U.S. state of Indiana.

History
Norristown was platted in 1851, and named for James M. Norris, a local medical doctor.

Geography

References

Unincorporated communities in Shelby County, Indiana
Unincorporated communities in Indiana